The Roman Catholic Diocese of Doruma–Dungu is a diocese located in the city of Doruma–Dungu  in the Ecclesiastical province of Kisangani in the Democratic Republic of the Congo.

History
 February 24, 1958: Established as Apostolic Prefecture of Doruma from the Apostolic Vicariate of Niangara
 September 26, 1967: Promoted as Diocese of Doruma
 July 3, 1970: Renamed as Diocese of Doruma – Dungu

Bishops

Ordinaries, in reverse chronological order
 Bishops of Doruma–Dungu (Latin Rite), below
 Bishop Richard Domba Mady (1994.03.14-2021.07.03)
 Bishop Emile Aiti Waro Leru’a (1983.05.07 – 1989.09.25)
 Bishop Guillaume van den Elzen, O.S.A. (1970.07.03 – 1983.05.07);  see below
 Bishop of Doruma (Latin Rite), below
 Bishop Guillaume van den Elzen, O.S.A. (1967.09.26 – 1970.07.03);  see above & below
 Prefect Apostolic of Doruma (Latin Rite), below
 Father Guillaume van den Elzen, O.S.A. (1958.11.13 – 1967.09.26); see above

Coadjutor bishop
Emile Aiti Waro Leru’a (1978-1983)

See also
Roman Catholicism in the Democratic Republic of the Congo

Sources
 GCatholic.org
 Catholic Hierarchy

Roman Catholic dioceses in the Democratic Republic of the Congo
Christian organizations established in 1958
Roman Catholic dioceses and prelatures established in the 20th century
1958 establishments in the Belgian Congo
Roman Catholic Ecclesiastical Province of Kisangani